Priča o ljubavi obično ugnjavi (trans. A Love Story Is Usually Annoying) is the ninth studio album from Serbian and former Yugoslav rock band Riblja Čorba, released in 1988.

With the release of the album, the band celebrated ten years of existence. The songs generally did not deal with politics (for what Riblja Čorba was well-known). The songs "Avionu slomiću ti krila", "Kaži, ko te ljubi dok sam ja na straži", and "Još jedna cigareta pre spavanja" were the album's biggest hits.

Album cover
The album cover was designed by Jugoslav Vlahović.

Track listing

Personnel
Bora Đorđević - vocals
Vidoja Božinović - guitar
Nikola Čuturilo - guitar
Vicko Milatović - drums
Miša Aleksić - bass guitar

Additional personnel
Kornelije Kovač - keyboards, producer
Aleksandra Kovač - backing vocals (on "Još jedna cigareta pre spavanja")
Kristina Kovač - backing vocals (on "Još jedna cigareta pre spavanja")
Vlada Negovanović - recorded by

References
Priča o ljubavi obično ugnjavi at Discogs
 EX YU ROCK enciklopedija 1960-2006,  Janjatović Petar;  
 Riblja čorba,  Jakovljević Mirko;

External links
Priča o ljubavi obično ugnjavi at Discogs

Riblja Čorba albums
1988 albums
PGP-RTB albums